Hongaku is an East Asian Buddhist doctrine often translated as "inherent", "innate", "intrinsic" or "original" enlightenment and is the view that all sentient beings already are enlightened or awakened in some way. It is closely tied with the concept of Buddha-nature.

Origins and development
The doctrine of innate enlightenment was developed in China out of the Buddha-nature doctrine. It is first mentioned in the Awakening of Faith in the Mahayana scripture. According to Jacqueline Stone, The awakening of faith in the Mahayana sees original enlightenment as "true suchness considered under the aspect of conventional deluded consciousness and thus denotes the potential for enlightenment in unenlightened beings." In medieval China, the doctrine developed from the Huayan school and also influenced Chan Buddhism.

The doctrine is also a common theme of the Platform Sutra of Huineng and was taught by Chinese Chan masters as "seeing original nature". Inherent enlightenment was often associated with the teachings of  sudden enlightenment and contrasted with the "gradual" approach and the idea of “acquired enlightenment” or shikaku. The first Japanese to write of this doctrine was Kūkai (774–835), founder of Shingon Buddhism.

In Japanese Buddhism
The doctrine of innate enlightenment was very influential in Tendai from the cloistered rule era (1086–1185) through the Edo period (1688–1735). The Tendai view of hongaku saw it as encompassing not only all sentient beings, but all living things and all nature, even inanimate objects - all were considered to be Buddha. This also includes all our actions and thoughts, even our deluded thoughts, as expressions of our innately enlightened nature.

Tamura Yoshirõ (1921–1989) saw original  as being defined by two major philosophical elements. One was a radical non-dualism, in which everything was seen as empty and interconnected, so that the differences between ordinary person and Buddha and all other distinctions, were ontologically negated. The other feature of hongaku was the affirmation of the phenomenal world as an expression of the nondual realm of Buddha nature. This was expressed in phrases such as “the worldly passions are precisely enlightenment” and “birth and death are precisely nirvana.”

The Tendai doctrine of hongaku had deep impact on the development of New Kamakura Buddhism, for many of those who founded new Kamakura Buddhist schools (Eisai, Honen, Shinran, Dogen and Nichiren) studied Tendai at Mount Hiei.

During the 1980s a Japanese movement known as Critical Buddhism has attacked original enlightenment as an ideology that supports the status quo and legitimates social injustice by accepting all things as they are as expressions of original Buddha nature.

See also
 Nirvana
 Nondualism
 Vajrasamadhi-sutra

References

Further reading
 Gregory, Peter N.; trans. (2005). The Sutra of Perfect Enlightenment. In: Apocryphal Scriptures, Berkeley, Numata Center for Buddhist Translation and Research, pp. 43-133 
 
 
 
 Stone, Jacqueline Ilyse (2004). "Original Enlightenment (Hongaku)", in Buswell, Robert E., ed.  Encyclopedia of Buddhism. Macmillan Reference USA; pp. 618-620. .
 Swanson, Paul (1997). Why they say Zen is not buddhism: Recent Japanese critiques of buddha nature. In: Jamie Hubbard (ed.), Pruning the Bodhi Tree: The Storm Over Critical Buddhism, Univ of Hawaii Press 1997, pp. 3-29. 
 Tamura Yoshirō (1984). Critique of Original Awakening thought in Shōshin and Dōgen, Japanese Journal of Religious Studies 11 (2-3), 243-266

See also
 Exclusivity (senju) and Innate Enlightenment (hongaku shiso) in Kamakura Buddhism

Virtue
Nondualism
Buddha-nature
Buddhism in the Heian period
Buddhism in the Kamakura period